Shah Quli Khan's Tomb is a tomb located in Narnaul in the Indian state of Haryana. It is the resting place of Shah Quli Khan, who was the governor of Narnaul. It was built in the 16th century.

One of the few examples of Mughal architecture in Narnaul, it is a monument of national importance.

History 
Shah Quli Khan was the Mughal governor of Narnaul during the reign of Akbar. The tomb was commissioned by Shah Quli Khan during his lifetime, and it remained a part of his estate.

Architecture 
The two storeyed octagonal tomb is situated on a raised platform. black and yellow marble, along with red sandstone.

To the West lies a large gateway leading to the tomb, known as Tripolia Gate. It is a brick building with little architectural significance.

References

External links 

 Feature on Haryana tourism website

Tombs in India
Monuments of National Importance in Haryana
Mughal tombs